Karl Schediwy was a male former international table tennis player from Austria.

Table tennis career
From 1933 to 1938 he won three medals in the World Table Tennis Championships.

All three medals came in the Swaythling Cup (men's team event) in 1934 (silver), 1935 (bronze) and 1938 (silver) respectively.

See also
 List of table tennis players
 List of World Table Tennis Championships medalists

References

Austrian male table tennis players
World Table Tennis Championships medalists